Nicolene 'Nici' Neal (born 2 March 1970) is a South African international lawn bowler.

Bowls career
She was born in Roodepoort, South Africa and was selected as part of the South African team for the 2018 Commonwealth Games on the Gold Coast in Queensland where she claimed two silver medals: in the Fours with Elma Davis, Johanna Snyman and Esme Kruger and the Pairs with Colleen Piketh.

She won the 2014 & 2016 singles titles and the 2016 fours title at the South African National Bowls Championships bowling for the Leases Bowls Club. In 2015 she won the pairs gold medal at the Atlantic Bowls Championships.

In 2019 she won the pairs gold medal and fours silver medal at the Atlantic Bowls Championships and in 2020 she was selected for the 2020 World Outdoor Bowls Championship in Australia.

References

1970 births
Living people
Bowls players at the 2018 Commonwealth Games
South African female bowls players
Commonwealth Games silver medallists for South Africa
Commonwealth Games medallists in lawn bowls
Medallists at the 2018 Commonwealth Games